The 2018 North Sumatra gubernatorial election took place on 27 June 2018 as part of the simultaneous local elections. It was held to elect the governor of North Sumatra along with their deputy, whilst members of the provincial council (Dewan Perwakilan Rakyat Daerah) will be re-elected in 2019.

Candidates were former Governor of Jakarta Djarot Saiful Hidayat and former commander of Kostrad Lt. Gen Edy Rahmayadi.

Timeline
On 10 September 2017, the KPU declared that there will be 10,194,368 eligible voters in the province. The North Sumatran KPU set a budget of Rp 855 billion (US$59.9 million) for the election.

Registration for party-backed candidates were opened between 8 and 10 January 2018, while independent candidates were required to register between 22 and 26 November 2017. The candidates were assigned their ballot numbers on 13 February 2018. The campaigning period would commence between 15 February and 24 June, with a three-day election silence before voting on 27 June.

Candidates
Under regulations, candidates are required to secure the support of a political party or a coalition thereof comprising at least 20 seats in the regional house. Alternatively, independent candidates may run provided they are capable of securing support from 6.5 percent of the total voter population (764,578) in form of photocopied ID cards subject to verification by the local committee although no candidates expressing interest managed to do this.

While acting governor Tengku Erry Nuradi was eligible to run, he failed to secure sufficient support with his party Nasdem placing their support behind Edy-Musa instead.

Rahmayadi first registered at Hanura to run for the gubernatorial seat in August 2017, through his running mate and young entrepreneur Musa Rajeckshah. Gerindra, PKS and PAN declared their support for him in late December 2017. In order to participate in the election, Rahmayadi resigned from his position as Commander of the Kostrad in 2018. While initially expressing support for incumbent Tengku Erry Nuradi, Golkar and Nasdem diverted their support for Edy-Musa as well.

Djarot Saiful Hidayat, who lost as a running mate in the 2017 elections in Jakarta and briefly became its governor following the incarceration of Basuki Tjahaja Purnama, was declared by PDI-P as their candidate on 5 January 2018. Sihar Sitorus became his running mate, and the pair secured the support of PPP making them eligible to run.

Also registering as early as August, J.R. Saragih who was also the regional chair of Demokrat obtained official support on September. Closer to the registration limit, PKB declared their support once their cadre Ance Selian became running mate. PKPI, which held 3 seats in the regional parliament despite having none in the People's Representative Council, declared their support for the pair allowing them to run, but diverted their support to Djarot-Sihar after the registration process had been completed. However, the pair was disqualified due to failing verification in February 2018. After a failed lawsuit, the pair withdrew from the election and asked for their supporters to vote for Djarot instead.

Polling

After formal nominations

Before nominations

Results

Quick count

References

2018 Indonesian gubernatorial elections
Elections in North Sumatra